Whalleyana vroni is a species of moth in the genus Whalleyana. It was described by Pierre Viette in 1977. It is found in Madagascar.

References

Moths described in 1977
Obtectomera
Taxa named by Pierre Viette
Moths of Madagascar